Arak University of Technology (Danshgah-e Sân'ti-ye Arak), formerly known as Iran University of Science and Technology, Arak Branch, is one of the engineering universities in Iran, located in the city of Arak.

History 
The university was founded in 1988.

Departments

References

External links
 www.arakut.ac.ir
 Geomatics S.A

Arak, Iran
Universities in Iran
Buildings and structures in Markazi Province
Education in Markazi Province
1988 establishments in Iran
Educational institutions established in 1988